The Šakvice train disaster occurred on 24 December 1953 in Czechoslovakia (now the Czech Republic). A local train was standing at the Šakvice station near Brno, when the Prague-Bratislava express ran into it, resulting in 103 deaths and a further 83 injured. The Ministry of the Interior said there was gross negligence by a number of railway men who had since been arrested. Other reports said that the express train crew had consumed a number of bottles of wine. Other sources have over 100 or 186 deaths.

This rail accident was one of the 20 most serious rail accidents by death toll to 1953.

References
The Times (London) 29 December 1953, page 5

External links
Paragraph on this and other Christmas accidents

Train collisions in Czechoslovakia
Railway accidents and incidents in the Czech Republic
Railway accidents in 1953
1953 in Czechoslovakia
Břeclav District
December 1953 events in Europe